Harutaeographa rama is a moth of the family Noctuidae. It is found in Pakistan (Jammu and Kashmir).

References

Moths described in 1996
Orthosiini